Summer of Love is a novel by Lisa Mason.  It is about a time traveler from the year 2467, who goes back in time to the 1967 Summer of Love.

Reception

Summer of Love was a finalist for the 1994 Philip K. Dick Award.

Publishers Weekly described it as "psychedelic" and "quirky", and lauded Mason's "extrapolations (of) future social and environmental conditions" as "intriguing and plausible", but faulted it for having a "(r)ecycled premise and two-dimensional characters". Entertainment Weekly called it "The Terminator in love beads".

In 2013, David G. Hartwell included it on the New York Review of Science Fictions list of "200 Significant Science Fiction Books by Women, 1984–2001".

References

1994 American novels
Novels about time travel
1994 science fiction novels
American science fiction novels
Fiction set in 1967